Douglas B. Chaffee (born November 9, 1943) is an American politician and retired attorney serving as a member & former Chair of the Orange County Board of Supervisors from the 4th district. Elected in November 2018, he assumed office on January 7, 2019. He Previously served as a councilman for the At Large district in the Fullerton City Council. In December of 2017 he was selected to serve as Mayor Pro Tem of Fullerton and the following year he was selected as Mayor of Fullerton

Early life and education 
Chaffee was raised in Anaheim, California before moving to Fullerton, California, where he graduated from Fullerton Union High School in 1961. He earned a Bachelor of Arts degree in economics from the University of Redlands in 1965 and a Juris Doctor from the Northwestern University School of Law in 1968.

Career 
Prior to entering politics, Chaffee worked as an attorney. Chaffee was elected to the Fullerton, California City Council in 2012 and served until 2018. He was selected to serve as mayor in 2018. In November 2018, Chaffee was elected to the Orange County Board of Supervisors, the first Democratic member elected in 12 years. He assumed office on January 1, 2019. Since January 2022, Chaffee has served as chair of the Orange County Board of Supervisors.

In May 2020, Chaffee was a guest on KPCC, where he discussed Orange County beach closures amid the COVID-19 pandemic.

In addition to the Orange County Board of Supervisors, he serves on the board of the Orange County Transportation Authority.

Personal life 
Chaffee and his wife, Paulette, have been married since 1977. They have two sons.

References 

Living people
California Democrats
California lawyers
People from Anaheim, California
People from Fullerton, California
University of Redlands alumni
Northwestern University Pritzker School of Law alumni
Orange County Supervisors
1943 births